James Barney Hubbard (March 7, 1930 – August 5, 2004) was sentenced to death by the state of Alabama in 1977 for the murder of Lillian Montgomery, with whom he was living after having been released from prison. Hubbard had served a 20-year sentence for murder and called police to report a shooting on January 10, 1977. He said Lillian had shot herself at her home in Tuscaloosa, Alabama. She died as the result of three gunshot wounds, one to the face, one to the head, and one to the shoulder. He was executed by lethal injection 27 years after the murder. At age 74, he was the oldest American to be executed in decades.

See also
 Capital punishment in Alabama
 Capital punishment in the United States
 List of people executed in Alabama
 List of people executed in the United States in 2004

General references
James Barney Hubbard
La Times Aging, Ill Inmate Is Next in Line for Execution Henry Weinstein December 12, 2005

1930 births
2004 deaths
American people convicted of murder
People executed for murder
21st-century executions of American people
21st-century executions by Alabama
People executed by Alabama by lethal injection
People convicted of murder by Alabama